The Senegal men's national tennis team represents Senegal in Davis Cup tennis competition and are governed by the Fédération Senegalaise de Tennis. They have not competed since 2005.

They reached the Group I semifinals in 1988.

History
Senegal competed in its first Davis Cup in 1984.

Current team (2022) 

 Seydina Andre
 Nicolas Jadoun
 Yannick Languina
 Hassimiyou Dieng

See also
Davis Cup
Senegal Fed Cup team

External links

Davis Cup teams
Davis Cup
Davis Cup